William Richard Wallace (August 1881 - 17 July 1989) was an Australian suspected murderer who spent most of his life in the J Ward facility for the criminally insane in Ararat, Victoria.  At his death, shortly before he was to turn 108, he was the oldest prisoner in Australian history, and oldest recorded prisoner in the world.

Biography
Bill Wallace was born in Young in 1881, to Alexander and Walterina (née Young) Wallace.

In 1926, he was arrested in connection for the shooting death of an American man named William Ernest Williams at the Waterloo Café in King Street, Melbourne.  It was alleged that Wallace had been angry at the man for refusing to stop smoking inside the café, and waiting outside for him to leave before fatally shooting him.

Whilst a number of customers in the cafe had seen Wallace and Williams arguing about the cigarette smoke while eating lunch, there were no witnesses to the actual shooting, and Wallace refused to cooperate with questioning, beyond basic information such as stating his name and place of birth.  Two separate doctors declared him to be insane and unfit to stand trial; he was subsequently sentenced to J Ward at the governor's pleasure.  

He was apparently happy living in J Ward, always wearing a suit which was bought annually from a tailor in Ararat, and spending his time playing chess and smoking.  However, he was also known for occasionally becoming violent and injuring fellow prisoners.

Publicity of his 100th birthday in 1981 led to a petition for his release, which was eventually granted.  However, he refused to leave, allegedly responding with the words "Don't be fucking silly, I live here."

Around this time, he was moved to the geriatric ward of Aradale Mental Hospital, where he spent the last years of his life, before dying on 17 July 1989 only a few weeks short of his 108th birthday, and buried at Ararat Cemetery.

References

Australian murderers
1881 births
1989 deaths
People from Young, New South Wales